The 2005 Cork Senior Hurling Championship was the 117th staging of the Cork Senior Hurling Championship since its establishment by the Cork County Board in 1887. The draw for the 2005 fixtures took place at the Cork Convention on 12 December 2004. The championship began on 27 May 2005 ended on 16 October 2005.

Na Piarsaigh were the defending champions, however, they were defeated by University College Cork at the quarter-final stage.

On 16 October 2005, Newtownshandrum won the championship following a 0-15 to 0-09 defeat of Cloyne in the final. This was their third championship title overall and their first in two championship seasons.

Cloyne's Paudie O'Sullivan was the championship's top scorer with 3-19.

Team changes

To Championship

Promoted from the Cork Premier Intermediate Hurling Championship
 St. Catherine's

Results

Divisions and colleges section

First round

Second round

Preliminary round

First round

Second round

 Delanys received a bye.

Third round

 Sarsfields received a bye.

Quarter-finals

Semi-finals

Final

Championship statistics

Top scorers

Top scorer overall

Top scorers in a single game

References

Cork Senior Hurling Championship
Cork Senior Hurling Championship